Vanzetta Penn McPherson (born May 26, 1947) is an American lawyer and judge. She served as the United States magistrate judge for the United States District Court for the Middle District of Alabama.

References

1947 births
Living people
20th-century American judges
20th-century American lawyers
21st-century American judges
Alabama lawyers
African-American judges
African-American lawyers
Columbia Law School alumni
Columbia University alumni
Howard University alumni
United States magistrate judges
20th-century American women lawyers
20th-century American women judges
21st-century American women judges
20th-century African-American women
20th-century African-American people
21st-century African-American women
21st-century African-American people